Langston Kerman is an American actor, writer, and comedian. He has acted in programs including Insecure, High Maintenance, Bless This Mess, and The Boys. Kerman is a writer and co-star on HBO Max's South Side. His first comedy album, Lightskinned Feelings, was named to Vulture's list of 10 Best Comedy Albums of 2018.

Early life and education
Kerman was raised in Oak Park, Illinois. His mother is African American and his father is white and Jewish. He received his bachelor's degree in English from University of Michigan in 2009. After college he taught poetry at his former high school for one year. Kerman later received an MFA in poetry at Boston University and then decided to pursue a full-time career in stand-up comedy.

Career
Kerman has acted in shows such as on Adam DeVine's House Party, High Maintenance, Strangers, and Comedy Bang! Bang!. He was selected by host Chris Rock to write for the 2016 Academy Awards.

In 2016, he appeared in his first recurring acting role as Jered on the first season of Issa Rae's scripted comedy series Insecure. The role led to wider recognition.

In September 2018, Kerman was featured in his own Comedy Central Stand-Up Presents special, Lightskinned Feelings. On the same day he also released an hour-long comedy album of the same name, which was recorded at Punchline Comedy Club in San Francisco. It was named to Vulture's 10 Best Comedy Albums of 2018.

Kerman has a voice-over role in IMDb's 2019 animated series You're Not a Monster. He also appeared in the 2019 Comedy Central series The New Negroes, and is also a writer and recurring actor for the HBO Max series South Side.

He was a series regular on the second season of Bless This Mess, and appeared in a recurring role on the second season of The Boys.

In August 2020 Kerman created the comedy podcast My Momma Told Me on the iHeartRadio Network. He discusses various Black conspiracy theories that he and his guests learned from their mothers.

Kerman co-created and co-stars in the 2022 Peacock series Bust Down.

Personal life 
Kerman is married. He and his wife have one child (b. 2021).

Filmography

Film

Television

References

External links 
Official website

Living people
21st-century American male actors
African-American stand-up comedians
American stand-up comedians
American male television actors
Actors from Oak Park, Illinois
University of Michigan College of Literature, Science, and the Arts alumni
Boston University College of Arts and Sciences alumni
African-American screenwriters
21st-century African-American people
1986 births